El Llano, Dominican Republic (in English, The Plain) is a Dominican municipality in the Elías Piña province.

Population

The municipality had, in 2002, a total population of 8,151: 4,376 men and 3,775 women. The urban population was 30.23% of the total population.

History
El Llano was elevated to the category of municipality by the law 3208 of 2 July 1974. Before that date, it was part of Comendador.

Economy
The main economic activity of the municipality is agriculture.

References

Populated places in Elías Piña Province
Municipalities of the Dominican Republic